Russell W. Barber (May 18, 1911 – February 18, 1996) was an American curler.

Barber was an inspector of detectives.

Teams

References

External links

1911 births
1996 deaths
American male curlers
American curling champions